Scribner House may refer to:
 Scribner House (New Albany, Indiana), listed on the National Register of Historic Places (NRHP)
 Scribner House (Cornwall, New York), listed on the NRHP